Larry Mark Christiansen (born June 27, 1956) is an American chess player of Danish ancestry. He was awarded the title Grandmaster by FIDE in 1977. Christiansen was the U.S. champion in 1980, 1983, and 2002. He competed in the FIDE World Championship in 1998 and 2002, and in the FIDE World Cup in 2013.

Biography
Christiansen grew up in Riverside, California, United States. In 1971, he became the first junior high-school student to win the National High School Championship. He went on to win three invitational U.S. Junior Championships in 1973, 1974, and 1975. In 1977, at age 21, he became a grandmaster without first having been an international master. Christiansen tied for first place with Anatoly Karpov at Linares 1981. He won the 2001 Canadian Open Chess Championship. He also won Curaçao 2008 and the Bermuda Open 2011.

Christiansen played on the United States teams in the Chess Olympiad in 1980, 1982, 1984, 1986, 1988, 1990, 1992, 1996 and 2002. He won the team silver medal in 1990 and the team bronze in 1982, 1984, 1986 and 1996.

Christiansen describes his playing style as "aggressive-tactical", and he lists his favorite opening as the Sämisch King's Indian.

Notable games
 Larry Christiansen vs. Chessmaster 9000 (September 2002), annotated at GameKnot:
Game 1, Game 2, Game 3, Game 4

Books
 Christiansen, Larry (2000). Storming the Barricades. Gambit Publications. .
 Christiansen, Larry (2004). Rocking the Ramparts. Batsford.

See also
 Deep Blue (chess computer)

References

External links
 
 
 
 
 
 
 worldchessnetwork.com
 biography

1956 births
Living people
American chess players
American chess writers
Chess grandmasters
Chess Olympiad competitors
People from Riverside, California
American male non-fiction writers
American people of Danish descent